Dolce Vita Africana is a British 2008 documentary film.

Synopsis 
Dolce Vita Africana is a documentary about the internationally renowned Malian photographer Malick Sidibé, whose iconic images from the late 1950s through the 70s captured the carefree spirit of his generation asserting their freedom after independence and up until an Islamic coup ushered in years of military dictatorship. The filmmaker travels to Sidibé's studio in Bamako, Mali, to witness the artist at work and meet many of the subjects of his earlier photographs, whose personal stories also tell the history of Mali.

External links 

2008 films
British documentary films
2008 documentary films
Documentary films about photographers
Films shot in Mali
2000s British films